The pallid sculpin (Cottunculus thomsonii) is a species of fish in the family Psychrolutidae (blobfishes).

Etymology
The specific name refers to Charles Wyville Thomson.

Description

It is greyish-brown in colour.

Habitat

Behaviour
Feeds on small invertebrates.

References

Pallid sculpin
Fish described in 1882
Fish of the North Atlantic
Taxa named by Albert Günther